The Squeeze is a 1977 British gangster thriller, directed by Michael Apted, based on a novel by Bill James (under the pseudonym David Craig). The screenplay was written by Minder creator Leon Griffiths.

The production headlines a major cast made up of American actor Stacy Keach, and British actors Edward Fox and David Hemmings. Irish actor Stephen Boyd was also featured in a major (and final) role as a gangster.

Apted called it an "informed look at the British underworld" and said Warner Bros considered the film "too indigenous."

Plot summary
Before the action depicted in the film begins, Jill had left Naboth who, despite his habitual overdrinking, had managed to keep custody of their two sons. He had lost his job as a police detective and become a private investigator. Jill had since married Foreman and lived with him and his daughter Christine.

In the film, Keith leads a gang of criminals including Barry and Taf and their driver Des. They kidnap Jill and Christine, using them to blackmail Foreman into helping the gang raid his security van full of cash. Foreman employs Naboth to help him recover Jill and Christine without doing any damage to his business reputation which he highly prizes.

Naboth follows Foreman to a rendezvous and discovers that the gang leader, Keith, was someone he had successfully investigated when he was a police detective. He tracks the gang to Vic’s house where he intends to rescue Jill and Christine but, instead, Keith recognises him and they beat him up, strip him naked, and send him home.

Jill and Christine are detained by Keith, Barry, Des and Taf in a flat. Christine is left in a room with toys and a bed and rarely features in the action. Jill complies with the men’s demands for her to keep them occupied with cooking and playing backgammon, but eventually they intimidate her into stripping naked in front of them, echoing the way Naboth had been humiliated at Vic’s house.

After the security van raid takes place, Jill and Christine are taken to be handed over to Foreman. Christine is released. Through circumstances, Vic’s daughter is also present and Naboth seizes her, threatening to shoot her if Jill is not released, and eventually she is. Naboth apprehends Vic.

The plot relies on the relationships between the main characters including Jill’s history with Naboth, Foreman valuing his business more than his wife, Naboth and Keith’s past conflict as detective and criminal, and a sub-plot involving Naboth’s relationship with his friend Teddy. It leaves open the possibility that Foreman was in on the kidnap plot as a means of stealing the company’s money and humiliating Jill.

Cast
 Stacy Keach as ex-detective Jim Naboth
 Freddie Starr as Naboth’s friend Teddy
 Carol White as Jill
 Alison Portes as Jill’s daughter Christine
 Edward Fox as Jill’s husband Foreman

Kidnap gang
 David Hemmings as Keith
 Stephen Boyd as Vic
 Roy Marsden as Barry
 Stewart Harwood as Des
 Alan Ford as Taff

Other characters
 Hilary Gasson as Barbara
 Rod Beacham as Dr. Jenkins
 Leon Greene as Commissionaire
 Lucinda Duckett as Sharon
 Marjie Lawrence as Beryl
 Steve Jones (extra)

Production
The film was shot in London in October 1976. Keach had lived and worked in London for many years. He says Apted was "a wonderful and intelligent director" who cast the actor on the basis of his appearance in Conduct Unbecoming.

The producers of The Squeeze enlisted an ex-gangster called Bob Ramsey to act as a contact between the film unit and the local underworld to cut down on harassment, due to location shooting in rather undesirable areas where criminals were operating. Local people in the area were hired as extras. Sex Pistols guitarist Steve Jones accidentally became an extra in the film.

Reception
Leon Hunt found The Squeeze to be "a better sequel to Sweeney! than Sweeney 2 ...[with] its "superbly drawn and vividly played villains".

Sight and Sound said that Apted "makes a fair fist of transferring the dirty cop thriller to Notting Hill" with "real world flair", but it found "Stacey Keach's problems as a drunken ex-copper ... unengaging."

Keach said the film "didn't translate in America but it was well regarded and successful in England."

Footnotes

External links
 
 
 
 

1977 films
1970s crime thriller films
British crime thriller films
Films directed by Michael Apted
1970s English-language films
1970s British films